Feldkirch railway station serves the city of Feldkirch, in the Feldkirch district of the Austrian federal state of Vorarlberg.  Opened in 1872, it forms the junction between the Vorarlberg railway and the Feldkirch–Buchs railway.

The station is owned and operated by the Austrian Federal Railways (ÖBB).

Location
Feldkirch railway station is situated in Bahnhofplatz, in the northern Feldkirch district of Levis, between the Ardetzenberg and the Känzele.

History
The station was opened on 1 July 1872, together with the rest of the Vorarlberg railway. The original station building was repeatedly extended from 1884, as the Arlberg railway transformed Feldkirch into an international transport hub.

In the 1960s, the original station building was torn down. In early 1969, the new building was put into operation.

Between 1999 and 2001, the station was renovated and rebuilt again, as part of the ÖBB-Bahnhofsinitiative. The renovation work included replacement of the platforms, the pedestrian underpass and the station building.

In 2010, in a survey conducted by the Verkehrsclub Österreich (VCÖ), the station was nominated by the interviewed passengers as the sixth most beautiful railway station in Austria.

Services
Feldkirch is one of Vorarlberg's major railway stations. It also serves as a loading station for the motorail train from Feldkirch to Vienna, Graz and Villach.  Additionally, Feldkirch is the border station of the line to Buchs; it is the only Austrian border station adjacent to the Principality of Liechtenstein.

Customs
Feldkirch station is, for customs purposes, a border station for passengers arriving from Liechtenstein and Switzerland. As such, checks may be performed in the station by Austrian customs officials. Systematic passport controls were reduced when Switzerland joined the Schengen Area in 2008 and later scrapped when Liechtenstein joined in 2011.

Notable visitors

James Joyce
Irish writer James Joyce paid a visit to Feldkirch in 1932 to see his friend Eugene Jolas. During the visit, he said to Jolas, "Over there, on those tracks, the fate of Ulysses was decided in 1915."  Since Bloomsday 1994, the quote has been displayed in German translation in the station concourse.

Joyce had travelled through Feldkirch by train in 1915.  Due to World War I, he had been considered an "enemy alien" in his then home town of Trieste, which, at that time, was part of Austria-Hungary.  Thanks to influential friends, he had obtained permission to leave Austria-Hungary, with his partner Nora Barnacle and their two shared children, and travel to Zürich.  Meanwhile, his brother Stanislaus Joyce was arrested in Trieste and detained until the end of the war.

During border control checks at Feldkirch, the train on which Joyce and Barnacle were travelling was boarded, and passengers inspected by officials; Joyce escaped arrest by a whisker.  If Joyce had been arrested then, he would have been unable to write Ulysses in its present form, hence his comment to Jolas.

At the end of 2001, the ÖBB replaced a plaque mounted by the Feldkirch culture circle above the ticket counters on Bloomsday 1994 with a more conspicuous presentation of the Joycean literary quotation.

Stefan Zweig 
In his memoirs The World of Yesterday (German: Die Welt von Gestern), the Austrian writer Stefan Zweig explained that on 24 March 1919 he had been an eyewitness at Feldkirch railway station, as Charles I of Austria was deported from the Republic of German Austria into exile in Switzerland:

See also

History of rail transport in Austria
Rail transport in Austria

References

Notes

Explanatory note

Further reading

External links 

 Nachbaur, Ulrich: Als der Zug langsam in Feldkirch einfuhr - Literary memories of the flight from Austria to Switzerland in early 1938. 

This article is based upon a translation of the German language version as at August 2011.

Railway stations in Vorarlberg
Railway stations opened in 1872
Vorarlberg S-Bahn stations